Maldivian nationality law is contained in the provisions of the Maldivian Citizenship Act and in the relevant provisions of the Constitution of the Maldives. A person may be a citizen of the Republic of the Maldives through birth, descent, marriage to an Maldivian citizen or through naturalisation.

Acquisition of citizenship

At birth

Birth in the Republic of the Maldives does not automatically confer to citizenship unless 
 
 At least one of his/her parents are citizens in of the Maldives at the time of birth.
 The child is found abandoned with no knowledge of the whereabouts of the parents.

By descent

A person is an Maldivian citizen by descent if, at the time of his or her birth, at least one of his or her parents was an Maldivian citizen. The place of that person's birth is not a deciding factor.

By adoption

All adoptions performed or recognised under Maldivian law confer Maldivian citizenship on the adopted child (if not already an Maldivian citizen) if at least one of the adopters was an Maldivian citizen at the time of the adoption.

By marriage

Foreign spouses of Maldivian citizens are not automatically granted citizenship, and are not required to obtain Maldivian citizenship.

By naturalisation

Any person, who wishes to become a citizen of Maldives, shall submit a written application to the Ministry of Foreign Affairs, provided they fulfil  the following conditions;

 They are Muslim
 They have attained the age of 21 and is of sound mind
 They have resided in the Maldives for a continuous period of 12 years. They shall be deemed to have complied with the said requirement if they have resided abroad, provided that the period is not more than 6 months, and has resided in the Maldives for a period amounting in the aggregate to more than 10 years.
 They have an adequate knowledge with regard to the Maldivian Constitution.
 They can write and speak in the Dhivehi language.
 If they are a citizen of any country other than Maldives, provided he has renounced the citizenship of that country in accordance with the law therein force in that behalf and has officially notified in writing such renunciation to the Government of Maldives.

The president of the Maldives may, in his discretion, grant the citizenship of to any person, who makes or has made an application for registration as a
Maldives, subject to his qualification of the provisions of this Act.

Loss of citizenship

By renunciation

Voluntary renunciation of Maldivian citizenship is permitted by law. Final permission must be granted by the President of the Maldives.

Involuntary

There are no provisions for the involuntary loss of Maldivian citizenship. Persons who acquire a new citizenship should not assume that they have lost their Maldivian citizenship by default.

Dual citizenship

Dual citizenship is recognised in the Maldives and any Maldivian citizen acquiring citizenship will not lose their original citizenship in the Maldives. Maldivian citizens are not required to register or justify their dual citizenship status.

Commonwealth citizenship

Maldivians are also Commonwealth citizens.

Travel freedom of Maldivian citizens

References

Maldives and the Commonwealth of Nations
Nationality law
Law of the Maldives